The surname Buchtel may refer to:

 Henry Augustus Buchtel (1847–1924), American public official and educator
 John R. Buchtel (1820–1892), American businessman and philanthropist
 Michal Buchtel (b. 1986), Czech slalom canoer

See also 
 Buchtel (disambiguation)
 

German-language surnames